The 1989 Men's Hockey Champions Trophy was the 11th edition of the Hockey Champions Trophy, an international men's field hockey tournament. It took place from 10 until 18 June 1989 in West Berlin, West Germany.

Australia won the tournament for the fourth time by finishing first in the round-robin tournament. The hosts West Germany were the defending champions but finished third.

Teams

Results

Goalscorers

See also
1989 Women's Hockey Champions Trophy

External links
Official FIH website

Champions Trophy (field hockey)
Champions Trophy
Hockey Champions Trophy
International field hockey competitions hosted by Germany
Sports competitions in West Berlin
1980s in West Berlin
1989 in Berlin
Hockey Champions Trophy